The Félix Award ( is an award, given by the Association du disque, de l'industrie du spectacle québécois (ADISQ) on an annual basis to artists working in the music and humor industry in the Canadian province of Quebec.

The award

The first Félix awards were presented on September 23, 1979. The idea belonged to the first president of ADISQ, Gilles Talbot. The award trophy was created by Marc-André Parisé.

The awards are named in honour of Quebec songwriter Félix Leclerc.

In contrast to the Juno Awards, whose nominations are based partially on record sales, nominations and winners of the Félix are decided by ADISQ members. The awards are given during an annual ceremony "Gala de l'ADISQ". Among the categories are Best-selling album, Best album (in various music genres), Songwriter of the year, Composer of the year, Song of the year, Male/Female singer of the year, Discovery of the year, Show of the year, etc.

The awards have sometimes been controversial. In 1983, songwriter Luc Plamondon attracted controversy by using his acceptance speech to denounce copyright law. In 1991, Céline Dion publicly refused the Félix for anglophone artist of the year for her English-language album Unison, not considering herself an anglophone artist. Instead she suggested to ADISQ to create a new award category for an artist who achieved the most success internationally. The next year such category was indeed created : Most successful artist performing in a language other than French (

Ceremonies

Partial list of recipients

See also

List of Quebec musicians
Music of Quebec
Culture of Quebec

References

External links
ADISQ

Awards established in 1979